Holten is a surname. Notable people with the surname include:

Anne Holten, Norwegian wrestler
Anthony Holten (1945-2020), Irish author
Bo Holten (born 1948), Danish composer and conductor
Dries Holten (born 1936), Dutch singer
Emma Holten (born 1991), Danish feminist
Hans Holten (1892–1973), Norwegian newspaper editor
John Holten, Irish artist, writer and curator
Kasper Holten (born 1973), Danish stage director
Katie Holten (born 1975), Irish artist
Mac Holten (1922–1996), Australian footballer
 Nicolai Abraham Holten (1775–1850), Danish banker and civil servant
Odd Holten (born 1940), Norwegian politician
Samuel Holten (1738–1816), American physician and politician
Sophie Holten (1858–1930), Danish painter
Suzette Holten (1863–1937), Danish painter and ceramist
Val Holten (1927–2015), Australian cricketer